Michael Bradford (born 1961) is an American musician. A native of Detroit, Michigan he is known mainly as a bass guitarist but also plays guitar and keyboards, and has done extensive work in music production and engineering. Among others, Bradford has worked with Madonna, Youngstown, Kid Rock, Uncle Kracker and in music for films. He is currently the guitarist for The Felons Club and can be heard on their debut album Welcome to the Club.

Early life
He was born and raised on Detroit's East Side, an area that was once a stable working-class neighborhood, but quickly deteriorated into decay after the city's tumultuous riots in 1967.

The late 1960s and early 1970s were also a remarkable time in Detroit for music. The Motown Sound was sweeping the nation, but also local bands like The Rationals, Bob Seger and The Frost were getting constant exposure on local radio, along with rock from bands like The James Gang, Sly and the Family Stone and Vanilla Fudge. Many of these bands performed at a local concert venue, The Eastown Theatre, on Harper Avenue. The theatre was a converted movie theatre, and was a short distance from the Bradford home. Due to the influence of the rock crowd, the theatre had gotten a reputation for being "one of the city's most notorious drug-infused rock venues". Michael's early exposure to rock music made him want to pursue a career in rock, rather than the more obvious choice of R&B.

In 1973, Michael was admitted to University Liggett School, a private school in Grosse Pointe Michigan.  Classmates included Jeffrey Eugenides, who would go on to write The Virgin Suicides and Middlesex. Michael stayed at ULS, graduating from the 12th Grade in 1978.

Gerard Smerek
Eventually, Michael started playing with local bands, and getting work in local Detroit recording studios, such as United Sound, Sound Suite and Ambience Recordings, in suburban Farmington Hills, MI. Ambience was a premiere studio at the time, and many records, commercials and industrial film soundtracks were recorded there. At Ambience, Michael met engineer Gerard Smerek, a local whiz who had  production and allowing Michael to assist him recording sessions. Gerard's work ethic, combined with his reminder to become "necessary and useful" to his clients by anticipating their needs, inspired Michael to want to work behind the scenes, at the side of the artists who came into the studio.

Earl Klugh
In 1981, Michael met jazz guitarist Earl Klugh, while working at Ambience. Earl was extremely successful at the time, making albums such as Crazy For You. Earl was one of the most successful of the new instrumental jazz artists, and his compositions were heard on radios all over the world. Earl is still considered to be "one of the finest acoustic guitar players" on the music scene, but what also impressed Michael was the income that Earl was producing from his album sales and the royalties from airplay and TV and film licenses. Earl tutored Michael in composition, using examples from composers like Antonio Carlos Jobim. Earl also educated Michael about the mechanics of publishing, copyright and licensing. This information inspired Michael to become serious about songwriting as a career in which he could make a living.

Anita Baker
Another artist who recorded at Ambience was Anita Baker. Gerard Smerek was her engineer as well, and Gerard brought Michael into Anita's camp to help with keyboard sounds and drum programming, using drum machines, samplers and recordings of percussion instruments to spice up the sound. This eventually led to receiving a production credit on Anita's 1994 album Rhythm of Love. The album went double-platinum, getting great reviews  and opening more doors for Michael.

Paul Buckmaster
After the success of Rhythm of Love, Michael was faced with a small dilemma. In 1994, faced with the choice between New York and Los Angeles, Michael chose Los Angeles, for the more agreeable climate. Upon his arrival, Michael was introduced to Paul Buckmaster, a legendary arranger for artists such as Elton John, Carly Simon and Train, and composer for films such as 12 Monkeys. Paul hired Michael as his programmer and engineer. Once again, a mentor relationship developed, and Paul taught Michael about arranging for orchestras, as well as giving Michael a basic understanding of film score techniques. Paul enlisted Michael's sound design and programming skills on independent films such as The Maker, starring Matthew Modine and Murder In Mind, starring Mary-Louise Parker. These sessions began a friendship and collaborative relationship that lasted until Buckmaster's death in 2017.

New Radicals
While working with Paul Buckmaster, Michael was introduced to Gregg Alexander, whose band New Radicals had recently been signed to a record contract with MCA Records. Michael was hired to be an engineer for the album, specializing in editing the dense and complex tracks in order to yield a cohesive set of songs that sounded live and spontaneous. Michael's inspiration for this technique came from reading about the production of Rolling Stones albums, such as Some Girls, that were edited performances that sounded live. Another influence was Paul Buckmaster's stories of Miles Davis and the edited nature of his albums.

Released in 1997 Maybe You've Been Brainwashed Too was a critical and commercial success, going Platinum in the U.S.A., and gold in several other countries.

Madonna
A recurring theme in Michael's life has been his association with artists from his home state of Michigan. Anita Baker, Earl Klugh and Gregg Alexander were all from the Detroit area. For his next project, Michael was introduced to Madonna by New Radicals producer Rick Nowels. Rick enlisted Michael to create electronica-inspired drum loops and beats, which were used as building blocks for songwriting sessions that Rick was having with Madonna. Some of these songs were finished, and became part of Madonna's 1998 album Ray of Light. Prior to this, Michael had worked with Madonna producer Stephen Bray, preparing tracks for an album called In the Beginning, a collection of songs written by Madonna and Bray before Madonna became a household name. Madonna took a liking to Michael, as he was from her home state of Michigan, and took to calling him "Detroit Mike", a nickname that he still is known by today.

Kid Rock
In 1998, Michael had been given a demo by another Michigan native, Kid Rock. Michael called Rock, to express his interest in his music, and to offer to introduce him to record executives in California. Although Kid Rock eventually found his own way to a deal with Atlantic Records, he never forgot Michael's belief in him, and invited Michael to join him on his tour, opening for Limp Bizkit. Michael built a small "rolling studio"  on Kid Rock's tour bus, and during this period, they recorded tracks for Kid Rock's triple-platinum album The History of Rock. Also, at this time, Michael met Kid Rock's DJ, Matt Shafer, aka Uncle Kracker. Uncle Kracker was signed to Kid Rock's Top Dog Records, and during the tour, production began on Uncle Kracker's first album, Double Wide.

With Kid Rock, Michael also created music for films such The Crow: Salvation, Any Given Sunday and Shanghai Noon. Michael also contributed to Kid Rock's collaborations with Tommy Lee's Methods of Mayhem and remixes for the band Mindless Self Indulgence.

Uncle Kracker

Uncle Kracker and Michael became frequent collaborators, starting with the co-writing of Kracker's breakout single "Follow Me". This song propelled Double Wide to eventually selling more than 2 million copies in the United States, with "Follow Me" becoming a top ten single in many countries around the world. Michael was also named as a producer of Double Wide, along with Kid Rock.

Michael stayed on to produce Uncle Kracker's next album, No Stranger to Shame, which went gold, and yielded the successful singles "In A Little While" and "Drift Away", a song that broke the record for the most weeks at #1 on the Hot Adult Contemporary Chart.

The next Uncle Kracker album was Seventy Two and Sunny also produced by Michael Bradford. This album explored Bradford and Kracker's fondness for 70's radio pop, and included guests Phil Vassar, Bret Michaels of the band Poison and Kenny Chesney.

For Uncle Kracker's fourth album, Happy Hour (2009), producer Rob Cavallo was brought in to make new recordings. However, some of Michael's songwriting was included, including "I'm Not Leaving" and "Another Love Song". Michael's production of "I'm Not Leaving" was also released on Happy Hour: The South River Road Sessions (2010), an EP of mixes, geared towards the country music market. This album also included "Letter To My Daughters", from No Stranger to Shame.

Another song originally intended for Happy Hour was called "Some People". This song has subsequently been recorded by the Georgia band REHAB.

In addition to album production, Michael and Uncle Kracker have created music for several films, including Good Boy!, Clockstoppers, Osmosis Jones and American Pie 2.

Beth Hart
In 2001, Michael was introduced to Beth Hart by Lava Records' President, Jason Flom. Michael and Beth began a musical collaboration that eventually yielded the 2003 album Leave the Light On. The album was well received by Beth's fans as well as the critics, including website epinions.com, who said of the album, "It's real, it's raw, and it's gorgeous"  The album featured Beth Hart's live band, with arrangements by Michael. Michael also played some additional keyboard and guitar overdubs during the post-productionphase of the album.

Deep Purple
In 2002, Michael was contacted by Disney Music Exec Brian Rawlings, who presented Mike with an offer to produce Deep Purple. Mike flew to England to meet Rawlings and then accepted an invite from Bruce Payne manager of Deep Purple to come to one of their concerts in Brighton, England. Upon arriving, Michael met the band and was presented with the opportunity to produce their next album. After the tour ended, Michael and the band set up camp in Los Angeles, to write and record the album Bananas, which was released in 2003. Reviews were positive, with Prog Archives Magazine commenting that Michael "proves himself to be a good songwriter, not just a great producer". The "Bananas" Tour went on to being a very successful run for the band, and Michael appeared onstage with Deep Purple several times during the promotion of the album.

In 2005, Deep Purple reconvened with Michael to record their next album, Rapture of the Deep. This album was recorded at Michael's private studio in Tarzana, California. The album was recorded quickly, due to Bradford's concern that taking a long time would lose the spontaneity of the band. Although some band members felt rushed, the result was an album that caused the BBC to report, "lengthy jams, heavy riffs, chugging basslines, and waves of deliciously smoking Hammond organ signal an intent within the Purple camp. They're back, and they are on form". The Rapture of the Deep tour found the band circling the globe yet again, and once again, Michael joined them on stage periodically, culminating in a 2006 performance at the Montreux Jazz Festival, the site first mentioned in Deep Purple's classic song "Smoke on the Water".

Dave Stewart

In 2007, Michael met artist Dave Stewart, formerly of Eurythmics, who was looking for someone who could put together a band for him to perform a retrospective of his famous songs with, and also to write arrangements so that the songs could be performed with an orchestra. The first of these shows was to be a performance at the Tower Music Festival, in front of the Tower of London. Stewart also had plans to record this material for an album, as well as new songs at a future date. Dave hired Bradford, and thus began a collaboration that has taken the two of then around the world. The album The Dave Stewart Songbook, Vol.1 was released in 2008. In August 2010, Stewart and Bradford traveled to Blackbird Studios in Nashville, TN to record a new album of songs with local musicians.

Film and television
Michael has been active in television and film music, with songs and productions of his appearing in movies as diverse as Disney's Cinderella II: Dreams Come True, Mission: Impossible 2, Freedom, the television series (Fox TV), Hannah Montana, Jump In and The Fan, starring Robert De Niro and Wesley Snipes.

Bass Renaissance
Ringo Starr and Mike
Although known as an accomplished songwriter and producer, Michael has always considered himself a bassist.  2010 has provided him with new opportunities to enjoy his primary instrument. January 2010 saw the release of Ringo Starr's new album Y Not, featuring Bradford on bass on certain tracks, along with fellow bassist Sir Paul McCartney on others. In July 2010, Michael was brought in by Dave Stewart and Glen Ballard to play bass on the upcoming Stevie Nicks album. Michael joined an A-List group of musicians for the album, including Waddy Wachtel, Steve Ferrone, Mick Fleetwood, Mike Rowe and Zac Rae. Michael has also enjoyed live performance in 2010, primarily with Jazz pianist Kevin Toney.

Bass sound

Michael is a proponent of Gibson Basses, primarily the Thunderbird 5-string model. Michael uses the Ampeg SVT-VR Bass Head with the matching 810E speaker cabinet. For live performances he prefers 2 heads and 2 cabinets. Michael uses a rack of effects by Line 6, including their Pod X3 Pro, Filter Pro, Mod Pro and Echo Pro rack-mount effects. Michael also uses the SWR Interstellar Overdrive Bass Preamp as a direct box signal. His slightly overdriven sound was inspired primarily by Deep Purple's Roger Glover, but also by the melodic styles of Jack Bruce, John Paul Jones and Mel Schacher of Grand Funk Railroad.

In addition to his Gibson Basses, Michael has a series of custom 5, 6 and 8-string basses made for him by Washburn Guitars. His most prized, and rarely seen bass is a one-of-a-kind fretless bass made for Michael by Joseph Santavicca, a luthier from Detroit. Joe has since died, making the bass truly irreplaceable. The bass took 2 years to complete, earning it the nickname "Slow Joe". It is usually kept in storage.

Guitar sound
Although primarily a bass player, Michael has played guitar since he was six years old. He has a large collection of electric and acoustic guitars, and is a lover of small-wattage, "boutique" amplifiers from THD, Gerhardt, Komet, and Blockhead. Michael also uses the larger ENGL Powerball, a four-channel amp with a 100 watt power rating. Michael uses 2 custom pedalboards with a variety of effects including the vintage A/DA Flanger and the Foxx Tone Machine, along with a Pete Cornish distortion box.

Production style
Although known for rock albums, Michael tends to take an old-school acoustic approach to recording, relying on microphone placement and room acoustics rather than outboard gear and effects. Working with the artist, Michael prefers a pre-production period where the songs can be written, played and critiqued before entering the studio to record. This requires the full involvement of the artist, and exposes any problems with the material before committing it to being recorded.

Once in the studio, Michael records quickly, following his often-spoken adage "If it takes too long, you are doing it wrong". This comes from Michael's experience with artists who, in search of perfection, end up undoing good work by constantly trying to improve it.

There is no signature "Bradford Sound", as he tries to do what is best for each artist. However, big guitars, simple lyrics and strong drums are his favorite hallmarks.

Michael plays many instruments on his productions, especially if the artist does not have a band, and he also does most of his own engineering and mixing. He is an avid user of Pro Tools software for recording and editing, but he has also been known to record basic tracks to tape.

Michael has had extensive experience recording vocalists including Anita Baker, Terence Trent D'arby and Mick Jagger. Michael prefers the CAD Audio VX2 Microphone, along with a hand built preamp from Frank DiMedia Labs and Manley Laboratories Opto-Compressor.

In Sound on Sound magazine, Michael summed up his philosophy this way: "For me it's really crucial to understand what the artist is basically trying to say through the record," Bradford explains. "That is, assuming the artist is actually trying to communicate some sort of deeper message, as opposed to just singing the song. Both kinds of record are valid — some are purely entertainment, whereas others have this whole level of communication going on, and if you are lucky enough to be part of one of those records, I think it's really important to listen to what the artist is trying to say. You can be of maximum use by just helping him or her to bring that out and get their point across."

Credits

References

External links
 The Detroit Riot of 1967: Events
Michael Bradford Interview - NAMM Oral History Library (2016)

1961 births
Living people
Guitarists from Detroit
20th-century American bass guitarists